Wu Chi-mei (1898 – 12 November 1956) was a Chinese physician and politician. She was among the first group of women elected to the Legislative Yuan in 1948.

Biography
In 1919 she established the Guangdong Women's Federation, which promoted equality of opportunity in education and employment and petitioned Sun Yat-sen and the Guangdong Provincial Assembly to advance these causes. She attended  and then worked as a researcher at the University of Chicago School of Medicine after she was sent to the United States, Europe and Singapore by the Guangzhou municipal government to study public health. A member of the Kuomintang, she became a member of the executive committee of the Guangzhou branch of the party and Guangzhou city council. She served on the party's central executive committee and was a member of the second . She also served as acting head of the Advanced Midwifery School.

Wu was a delegate to the 1946  that drew up the constitution of the Republic of China. She was subsequently a Kuomintang candidate in Guangzhou in the 1948 elections for the Legislative Yuan and was elected to parliament. She relocated to Taiwan during the Chinese Civil War, where she remained a member of the Legislative Yuan until her death in 1956.

References

1898 births
Chinese women physicians
University of Chicago alumni
20th-century Chinese women politicians
Members of the Kuomintang
Members of the 1st Legislative Yuan
Members of the 1st Legislative Yuan in Taiwan
1956 deaths
Physicians from Guangdong